Bartonella gabonensis is a bacterium from the genus Bartonella which has been isolated from the mouse Lophuromys sp. which was living in Franceville.

Genome
Scientists did whole genome sequence on the bacteria. They sequenced 100% genome of this new species. Genome of Bartonella gabonensis contained 1,971,183 bp with 47% G+C content. They also sequenced 17s RNA and other important genes. All genetic data of this bacteria was discovered by scientists.

Discovery 
The team who discovered it consisted of J. B. Mangombi, N. N'Dilimabaka, H. Medkour, L. Banga, M. L. Tall, M. Ben Khedher, J. Terras, S. Abdi, M. Bourgarel, E. Leroy, F. Fenollar and O. Mediannikov.

References

Bartonellaceae
Bacteria described in 2020